Taif is  a city and governorate in the Mecca Region of Saudi Arabia.

Taif may also refer to:

Taïf (arrondissement), arrondissement of Mbacké in Diourbel Region in Senegal
Taif Ajba, Abkhaz poet
Taif Sami Mohammed, Iraqi statesman
Tingsryds AIF, or simply TAIF, an ice hockey club based in Tingsryd, Sweden
TAIF JSC, former name of Sibur-RT, a Russian investment holding and oil company
Ottoman frigate Taif
A variant of Teyf, a surname

See also